Chum Phae is a district of Khon Kaen province, northeastern Thailand.

History
The area has been occupied since prehistoric times. The ruins of the town Non Mueang date from the Dvaravati period.

The establishment of the district was announced in the Royal Gazette on 3 August 1943, originally including tambons Chum Phae, Si Suk, Non Han, and Khua Riang, which were later divided into 10 tambons.

In 1965 the northeastern part of the district was split off to form Si Chomphu district. In 1981 the western portion of the district formed the district Phu Pha Man district.

Geography
Neighboring districts are (from the north clockwise): Phu Kradueng of Loei province; Si Chomphu, Wiang Kao, Phu Wiang and Nong Ruea of Khon Kaen Province; Ban Thaen, Phu Khiao, and Khon San of Chaiyaphum province; and Phu Pha Man of Khon Kaen.

Administration
The district is divided into 12 subdistricts (tambons), which are further subdivided into 142 villages (mubans). Chum Phae is a town (thesaban mueang) which covers parts of tambons Chum Phae, Nong Pai, and Chai So. There are two townships (thesaban tambon): Non Han covers parts of tambons Non Han and Non Sa-at, and Khok Sung Sam Phanat covers parts of tambons Non Udom and Khua Riang. There are a further 12 tambon administrative organizations (TAO).

Pop culture
Chum Phae served as the setting for the 1976 Thai action film Chum Phae by Philip Chalong.

References

External links
amphoe.com

Chum Phae